The Mimosa Wants to Blossom Too (German: Auch Mimosen wollen blühen) is a 1976 West German comedy spy film directed by Helmut Meewes and starring Curd Jürgens, Eric Pohlmann and Horst Frank.

The film's sets were designed by the art director Peter Rothe.

Cast
 Curd Jürgens as Josef Popov 
 Eric Pohlmann as Iwan Pederenko 
 Horst Frank as Oberst Oschenko 
 Susi Nicoletti as Emily Hopkins 
 Heinz Reincke as Obdachloser 
 Barbara Nielsen as Ludmilla 
 Chiquita Gordon as Miss Ly 
 Erich Padalewski as Mr. Gate 
 Ljuba Welitsch as Lady Shots 
 Harry Hardt as Sir Shots

References

Bibliography 
 Bock, Hans-Michael & Bergfelder, Tim. The Concise CineGraph. Encyclopedia of German Cinema. Berghahn Books, 2009.

External links 
 

1976 films
1970s spy comedy films
German spy comedy films
West German films
1970s German-language films
Films directed by Helmut Meewes
Cold War spy films
Constantin Film films
1976 comedy films
1970s German films